Awaken is an underground rock band / indie music project based in Belgium. They released two official albums and numerous demo tapes and web-only singles since their early days in 1988.
 
Not related to the modern Belgian scene at all (such as dEUS, Eté 67, Girls in Hawaii), Awaken gained interest from Vietnamese people, after the release of a Vietnamese song, "Chú Mèo Ngủ Quên", and in Japan with the virtual EP "別府NIGHTS". Recently, a cover of a Vietnamese children song "Rửa Mặt Như Mèo" has been recorded and has been heard on Vietnamese internet, though not officially released. Since 2005, Awaken is part of the team of the indies Japanese label It's Oh! Music, based in Miyazaki city.

Name
The name AWAKEN means "a matter of bubbles", according to the Japanese translation:
泡件 (awaken) or アワケン in Japanese
泡件 (pàojiàn) in Chinese
"Trường Hợp Bong Bóng" in Vietnamese

Genre
AWAKEN's style mixes disco beats and progressive structures, karaoke arrangements and heavy sounds, Belgian new beat rhythms and romantic new wave. The instrumentation is often focussed on keyboards and electronic sounds though electric guitar and bass guitar are more audible in recent songs.
AWAKEN's latest songs have been influenced by various places in Japan, Vietnam and the rest of the world : "The Train Is Leaving Kokura" mentions Kokura (小倉) and Usa (宇佐), "Beppu Nights" happens in Beppu (別府), known for its hot springs, "Wasabi Kiss" describes the peninsula of Shuzenji, "Yanagigaura" (柳ヶ浦) evoques the feeling of loneliness in the small city of Yanagigaura and "As A Start : Cà Phê And Pizza" is an imaginary trip from Italy, Vietnam and Japan. The 2009 single "My Last Evening In 大分" / "Chase Around 大分駅" is based on Gilles Snowcat's own memories of the city of Ôita, Japan.

Musicians
Being a project more than a band, different musicians appear following the recordings of the band, some as members and some as guests.

Present musicians (members and guests)
Irène Csordas: lead voice
Hakim Rahmouni: guitars
Nicolas Leroy: bass
Sébastien Bournier: voice and drums
Trustno1: keyboards
Jean-Paul Hupé: synthesizer programming
PatLap: lead voice and Electro-acoustic guitar
Paul G: electric guitar and lead voice
Trịnh Thanh Duyên: lead voice
日向逸夫先生 (Mr. Hyuga): programming
トゥイちゃん (Tui-Chan): harmony voice and FX
Gilles Snowcat (雪猫ジル): lead voice, synthesizers, keyboards, programming, electric guitar, bass guitar, percussion, add.flute

Past musicians (members and guests)
Fabien Remblier : lead voice and bass guitar
Ced Mattys : bass guitar
Zoé de York, Cedric Hamelrijck, Mike Wolf and Yves Larivierre : guitar
Karo VR : guitar and voice
小西順子さん, Ptit Bout, Julie Absil, Lionel Meessen, Amy Kay, Jenny Quinn, Gautier Elocman, Joëlle Yana, Ambre and Bridge : lead voice
Gina Mainardi, 猪瀬悠理さん, みゆさん, 五味田敬子さん, 福地麗さん, 森紀和子さん, Sophie de York, Evelyne, Anna-Maria and Orely : harmony voice
Floris VDV, Laetitia VDV and Carla : spoken voice
Socre : rap voice
Greg Revel : programming
Hervé Gilles : keyboards
Aurélia Thirion : keyboards and harmony voice
Vincent Trouble : accordion
Philippe Tasquin : violin
Elke P : drums
Pol X : guitar, drums and drum machine

Collaboration
Though independent, AWAKEN is collaborating with Japanese label It's Oh! Music and appears on J-pop singer Koiko's CD Vitamin!.
In 1999, AWAKEN was invited twice on stage to perform the song "Last Days Of The Century" with its creator Al Stewart.
French TV actor Fabien Remblier recorded several songs with AWAKEN in 2000 and was supposed to be part of the 20th anniversary single in 2008.

Repertoire (original songs and covers)
AWAKEN mixes original songs and covers, a similar attitude to Manfred Mann and Vanilla Fudge earlier. 
Artists that have been covered by AWAKEN include: 
Dick Annegarn
Tony Banks
Bee Gees
David Bowie
Georges Brassens
Captain Beyond
Cerrone
Alain Chamfort
Cold Chisel
Peter Criss
Deep Purple
Depeche Mode
Earth Wind & Fire
Fish
Matthew Fisher
Genesis
Ian Gillan / Roger Glover
Philip Glass
Michael Jackson
Jackson 5
Jacksons
Quincy Jones
Patrick Juvet
Kiss
Jon Lord
Paul McCartney
Manfred Mann's Earth Band
Metallica
Rufus
Frank Sinatra
Sparks
Al Stewart
Donna Summer
Supremes
Tangerine Dream
Toto
Uriah Heep
Vanilla Fudge
Neil Young

Nekokawa (猫川 - Dòng Sông Mèo)
AWAKEN has a side-project named NEKOKAWA since 2002, focussing on the ambient side of its music. NEKOKAWA is 猫川 in Japanese and Dòng Sông Mèo in Vietnamese.

Discography

LPs
Tales Of Acid Ice Cream (1 January 1996)
Party In Lyceum's Toilets (14 February 2001)
Moko-Moko Collection (『モコモコ・コレクション』) (22 February 2012, Gilles Snowcat solo release)
Nama Time!  (『生タイム!』) (9 December 2015, Gilles Snowcat solo release, live album)

EPs
Beppu Nights (『別府NIGHTS』) (2006) 
This Mouth... (nhạc cho Em Mèo) (2008, Gilles Snowcat solo release)
How Many L Were In Your Name? / My Last Evening In 大分 (Awaken version) / How Many L Were In Your Name? (hi-NRG mix) (2010)
Yanagigaura (『柳ヶ浦』) (2010, Gilles Snowcat solo release)

Singles (non-exhaustive listing)
"One Wild War (2002)
"山葵ＫＩＳＳ" (read: Wasabi Kiss) (2003)
"五本木の星" (read: Gohongi No Hoshi) (2003)
"ＤＲＵＮＫＥＮ熊" (read: Drunken Kuma) (2004)
"When Alena Entered The Quiet Room" (2004)
"Chú Mèo Ngủ Quên" (2005)
"As A Start : Cà Phê & Pizza" (2006)
"Áo Dài Màu Hồng" / "Xúp Sô-Cô-La" (2007)
"I Know Time Is Passing By..." / "別府NIGHTS" -disco take- (2008)
"Riding The Yellow Line Gives Vibrations" (2008, Gilles Snowcat solo release)
"The Blue Hanger" (pink disco yellow mix) / "Don't Worry Em Mèo (on the pops)" / "Riding The Yellow Line Gives Vibrations" (still shaking mix) (2009, Gilles Snowcat solo release)
"My Last Evening In 大分" / "Chase Around 大分駅" (2009, Gilles Snowcat solo release)
"Mardi Gras Station" (2017, Gilles Snowcat solo release) 
"バレた！" / "エレガントに" / "Three Kinds Of Milk (live)" (2017, Gilles Snowcat solo release)

TapesNumb (March 1993)Phase 2 : Scrappy (September 1993)Zéro Sur Dix, Encore Raté ! (Gilles Snowcat solo, August 1994)Awaken 3 : Blurp ! (January 1995)

Vintage and rare songs (non-exhaustive listing)
"Polygonal Mirror" (February 1988)
"Sandrine" (rough piano version) (July 1988)
"Interlude 6" (June 1988)
"Memories Of A Teenage Cat" (original studio version) (March 1989)
"Misty Conclusion" (live in studio, Beppu, Japan) (May 2007)

Contribution to tribute albumsYou Should Have Listened To AsmL, tribute albums to Al Stewart, 1997 and 2001.Lost In The Looking Glass, tribute album to Procol Harum, 2002

Party In Lyceum's ToiletsParty In Lyceum's Toilets is the second album by the music project Awaken, released in 2001. This double CD features original songs (volume 1) and covers (volume 2).

History
While its predecessor, Tales Of Acid Ice Cream, was completed in one studio only, Party In Lyceum's Toilets was recorded on a portable studio that was brought along to meet several musicians in Belgium and France. The first takes come from 1999, as the album was recorded rather slowly.

Controversy
Despite his efforts to introduce the new Awaken as a band, leader Gilles Snowcat fails, as the booklet details show that the quartet hardly plays together on more than six of the 41 tracks. The main band is then dubbed by 12 additional musicians. In some songs Snowcat plays alone or only with guest musicians, which caused anger from the main singer and the lead guitarist. Apart from the keyboardist, none of the musicians had played on the previous album Tales Of Acid Ice Cream.

Other information

The album was due to be released in September 2000, then as more songs were added it was postponed to  January 2001 but then technical problems made its actual release happen on Valentine Day.
Being influenced by the 33 rpm era, Awaken divided the two CDs into virtual sides. As a tribute to Earth Wind & Fire, each "side" of the volume 1 starts with a short piece as interlude, except the side 4 (for timing reasons).
The sides 1 and 2 were dedicated to regular songs, side 3 to more experimental pieces and side 4 to early Awaken songs from 1988 but recorded properly in 2000.
The song "Bonnie Parker Rêve" was written by a French composer whose family name was the same as Snowcat's first name, which induced some confusion from listeners. It is the only original Awaken song on this album that does not feature Gilles Snowcat in the writing credit.
The song "Four Dreams Suite" starts with the noise of a Porsche 911's engine and ends with musical bits recorded in 1988. The song itself is a new take from 2000, since no studio version had been recorded before.
The CD2 is only made of covers, some of them being interludes and into a conceptual shape named "Dark Dream Opera".

Track listing CD 1 (original songs)
side 1
Interlude: "Misty Conclusion"
"I'll Disagree"
"Cold As My Heart"
"Carla's Dream"
"Neons Of Lyceum's Toilets"

side 2
Interlude: "'The True Story Of Maïté D.H."
"Down The Drain"
"Dead In A Subway"
"Cutting My Loved One"
"Spleen Fourteen"

side 3
Interlude: "Ellen's Orange Room"
"Lycée Nase" (featuring 1030)
"Bonnie Parker Rêve" (featuring Hervé Gilles)
"Britney and Barry"

side 4
"Electric Time"
"Four Dreams Suite": i. Günz (a) Overture ; b) Over The 'A' ; c) Nine Elements Of Life) ii. Polygonal Mirror iii. Rising Forest iv. The Test v. Sweet Wave Of Ice Cream vi. Out Of The Flowerwall vii. Tygersmile viii. Interlude 6 ix. Sandrine x. 8888 xi. Subliminal Mountain xii. The World Where Bears Never Lock The Door xiii. Cucumber Phone xiv. Picture From An April's Dream xv. Lady S xvi. The Last Escape Of Lady S xvii. Dark Spring xviii. Four Dreams Epilogue''

Track listing CD 2 (covers)
side 1
"One Caress" (cover from Depeche Mode)
"Eesom" (cover from Quincy Jones)
"Send My Body Home" (cover from Dick Annegarn)
"One Thing" (cover from Neil Young) / "Best Kept Lies" (cover from Cold Chisel)

side 2
"L.A. Is My Lady" (cover from Frank Sinatra)
"Run Out Of Time" (cover from Genesis)
"You're Really Out Of Line" (cover from Rufus) / "Golden Age Dreams" (cover from Vanilla Fudge) / "I'm Gonna Love You" (cover from Peter Criss) / "Heart of Me" (cover from Cerrone)

side 3
"Nothing Else Matters" (cover from Metallica)
"Chrysalide" (cover from Patrick Juvet) / "Open The Kingdom" (cover from Philip Glass) / "The Dance" (cover from Uriah Heep)
"Sweet Thing" (cover from David Bowie)

side 4 : "A dark dream opera in 12 acts"
"Koyaanisqatsi" (cover from Philip Glass) / "Shandi" (cover from KISS) / "This Is Love" (cover from Tony Banks)
Interlude: "Clouds And Rain" (cover from Gillan & Glover)
"In Search Of England" (cover from Barclay James Harvest)
"Tyger" (cover from Tangerine Dream) / "Everybody" (cover from Jacksons)
"Sweet Dream Machine" / "Come Into My Life" / "Love I Never Knew You Could Feel So Good" (covers from Supremes)
"Something I Should Have Known" (cover from Matthew Fisher)
"Taking It Back" (cover from Toto)
Interlude: "Jazzy" (cover from Renaud Lhoest)
"Young Girls" (cover from Sparks)
Interlude: "(Theme) Once Upon A Time" (cover from Donna Summer)
"Only The Fool Survives" (cover from Donna Summer)
"Hearts To Heart" / "Moonwalk" (covers from Earth Wind & Fire)
"Here Today" (cover from Paul McCartney)
"The Candidate" (cover from Al Stewart)
"Until..." (cover from Bee Gees)

Musicians
Lionel Meessen : voice
Cedric Hamelrijck : guitar, additional drum programming
Julie 'Cunégonde' Absil : voice
Gilles Snowcat : keyboards, machines, bass guitar, voice, additional acoustic guitar, drum programming, tapes

Guest musicians
Carla : dream voice
Fabien Remblier : voice, bass guitar
Paul G : guitar, voice
Socre : rap voice
Patrick Laplagne : guitar
Mike Wolf : guitar
Orely : voice
Anna-Maria : voice
Evelyne : voice
Hervé Gilles : keyboards and programming
Laetitia Van der Vennet : spoken voice
Floris Van der Vennet : spoken voice

Design
Gilles Snowcat, Awaken, Patrick Laplagne, 1030 (Socre), Peter Clasen.

Availability
Online. Catalog number : awalp-002

Outtakes

Three songs had been completely recorded but finally dumped  :
"Dream Shapes On A Night Movie" : a progressive dance track.
"Interlude : Still Today / I'm 9" : an interlude that was supposed to open the side 4 of CD1, but rejected for timing reasons.
"Electric Time" : an alternate version, played and sung by Snowcat only, that was rejected to make place for a totally different take played by the whole group.
Other songs have been worked but never fully recorded : a cover version of Marillion's "The Party" and Yes' "Big Generator" being on the list. Other Awaken songs were planned to appear but not chosen on the final list and not even recorded at all. Most of the tapes have been deleted, which means a future remix without the songs fading out has become impossible to do.

References

External links
AWAKEN / Gilles Snowcat official site
It's Oh! Music official site
SOUSBOCK official site

Reviews
Coast To Coast
 Universal Wheels
Gibraltar Encyclopedia
Stay On Top
Forces Paralleles
Bee Gees World : mention of AWAKEN's covers of the Bee Gees' "Until..."

Belgian rock music groups